The 1964 West Virginia gubernatorial election took place on November 3, 1964, to elect the governor of West Virginia.

Results

Democratic primary

Republican primary

General election

Results by county

References

1964
gubernatorial
West Virginia
November 1964 events in the United States